It Illuminates, My Dear (German: Es leuchtet meine Liebe) is a 1922 German silent film directed by Paul L. Stein and starring Mady Christians, Hans Heinrich von Twardowski and Olga Belajeff.

Cast

References

External links

Films of the Weimar Republic
Films directed by Paul L. Stein
German silent feature films
UFA GmbH films
German black-and-white films